Alfred Arndt (1896 Elbing – 1976 Darmstadt) was a German architect. He was a student at the Bauhaus art school from 1921 to 1927 and from 1930 to 1931 he was Master of the Building and Interior Design Department at the school. From 1931 to 1932 he taught interior design, illustrative geometry and perspective at the Bauhaus.
In 1927 he married the Bauhaus trained photographer Gertrud Arndt (1903–2000). They had a daughter, Alexandra, born in 1931. In 1948 they moved to Darmstadt.

Buildings
1927–1928 Bauer residence, Probstzella, Thuringia
1936–1933 Haus des Volkes (Community centre), Probstzella, Thuringia

See also
Konrad Püschel

References

External links
Bauhaus100. Masters and teachers. Alfred Arndt
Bauhaus archive. Biographien. Alfred Arndt. (in German)

1896 births
1976 deaths
Bauhaus alumni
Academic staff of the Bauhaus
20th-century German architects
People from Elbląg